Leonid Alekseyevich Filatov (24 December 1946 – 26 October 2003) was a Soviet and Russian actor, director, poet, pamphleteer, who shot to fame while a member of the troupe of the Taganka Theatre under director Yury Lyubimov. Despite severe illness that haunted him in the 1990s, he received many awards, including the Russian Federation State Prize and People's Artist of Russia in 1996.

Biography
Filatov was born on 24 December 1946, in Kazan. His father was Aleksey Yeremeyevich Filatov (1910 - 1980s), his mother - Klavdia Nikolaevna Filatova (b. 1924). The family frequently moved around, because his father was a radio operator and spent much time in field expeditions. When Leonid was seven years old his parents divorced, and Leonid moved along with his mother to Ashkhabad to join his mother's relatives. While a schoolboy, he had his first publications in the Ashkhabad press.

After finishing school he arrived in Moscow in 1965, and tried to become a film director, but failed the entrance exam at the State Institute of Cinematography - VGIK . However, Filatov was persistent, and on the advice of a classmate he took the entrance exams to the actor's department of the Shchukin Theatrical School. In 1965 he was admitted to the course of B.K. Lvova and L.N. Shikhmatov, and graduated from Shchukin Theatrical School as an actor in 1969.

In 1969 Filatov became an actor with the troupe of the Moscow Taganka Theatre. His first main role was the lead in the stage version of What Is to Be Done? His career developed with roles in The Master and Margarita, The Cherry Orchard, The House on the Embankment, Fasten Your Seatbelts, Pugachev, Antiworlds, Comrade, Believe, the role of Horatio in Hamlet, Kul'chitskiy in The Fallen and Living, Federzoni in Life of Galileo, and Players-21 (a work with (Sergey Yursky’s creative association of artists).

From 1985 through 1987, while the Taganka Theatre was under Anatoly Efros, Leonid Filatov worked at the Sovremennik Theatre, then later returned to the Taganka. In 1993 Filatov joined Nikolai Gubenko, Natalya Sayko, Nina Shatskaya and other actors in founding a creative association named Fellowship of Actors of the Taganka (Russian: "Содружествo актеров Таганки").

He was the author of several plays, such as An Artist from Sherwood Forest and Sons of Bitches, among other works.

From 1970 Filatov worked in cinema. His most important roles were in such films as City of First Love, Air Crew, The Voice, Women Joke in Earnest, Rooks, Success, Chicherin, Forgotten Melody for a Flute, Zerograd, and Charity Ball.

In 1990 he directed the film Sons of Bitches, based on his own scenario, and also played a supporting role. It was entered into the 17th Moscow International Film Festival.

Since 1970 Filatov was writing songs in the co-authorship with Vladimir Kachan.

Leonid Filatov was married to the actress of the Fellowship of Actors of the Taganka Nina Shatskaya. The couple had a son and granddaughters.

Books
Oranges of a Beige Color
The Tale of Fedot the Strelets

Selected filmography
1980 —  Air Crew as Igor Skvortsov
1981 —  Could One Imagine? as Mikhail Slavin
1982 —  The Voice as Mister B.K.
1982 —  The Chosen One as film director
1984 —  Success as Gennadi Fetisov
1986 —  Wild Pigeon as Ivan Naydyonov (voice-over)
1987 —  Forgotten Melody for a Flute as Leonid Filimonov
1988 —  A Step as Gusev
1989 —  Zerograd as Alexei Varakin
1990 —  Sons of Bitches as Yuri Mikhailovich

References

Bibliography
 .

External links
 
 Leonid Filatov's Tale of Soldier Fedot the Daring Fellow in English (translated from the Russian by Alec Vagapov):
Leonid Filatov's Tale of Soldier Fedot, the Daring Fellow. Bilingual Version (Russian-English).

1946 births
2003 deaths
Burials at Vagankovo Cemetery
Mass media people from Kazan
Russian male actors
Soviet film directors
Russian male poets
Soviet male film actors
20th-century Russian poets
20th-century Russian male writers
Writers from Kazan
Actors from Kazan